"In Vain" is the fourth single from Dutch symphonic metal and rock band Within Temptation's seventh studio album Resist. It was released worldwide via digital download and streaming on 11 January 2019.

Background
"In Vain" is a power ballad song written for the band's seventh studio album Resist. The track features a "down-to-earth" production and uses "softer rock stylings" and "emotionally driven lyrics" in order to achieve the new direction the band aimed for the record. The song was released as the fourth single from the album and accompanied a lyric video. Differently from the previous singles, which were all played live before the album official release, the track only started being played on tour afterwards. Despite not entering any official single sales chart, the song found airplay rotation in selected places and managed to enter airplay charts in Belgium, Czech Republic and Finland, where it stayed for ten weeks.

Track listing

Personnel 
Within Temptation
Sharon den Adel – vocals
Ruud Jolie – lead guitar
Stefan Helleblad – rhythm guitar
Martijn Spierenburg – keyboards
Jeroen van Veen – bass
Mike Coolen – drums

Charts

References

2019 singles
2018 songs
Within Temptation songs
Songs written by Sharon den Adel
Songs written by Robert Westerholt